This is the list of awards and nominations received by the television series Friday Night Lights (2006–2011).

American Film Institute

Artios Awards
The Artios Awards have been presented since 1985 for excellence in casting. Hosted by the Casting Society of America, theatrical casting in over eighteen categories is honored.

Critics' Choice Television Award
The Critics' Choice Television Awards are presented by the Broadcast Television Journalists Association to honor the best in primetime television programming. They were created in 2011.

Directors Guild of America Awards

Eddie Awards
The Eddie Awards are presented by the American Cinema Editors.

Emmy Awards

Primetime Emmy Awards
The Primetime Emmy Awards are presented annually by the Academy of Television Arts & Sciences to honor excellence in television; they are considered to be the television equivalent to the Academy Awards.

Creative Arts Emmy Awards

EWwy Awards
The Ewwy Awards are presented by Entertainment Weekly to honor worthy actors and series not nominated for the Primetime Emmy Awards.

George Foster Peabody Award

Humanitas Prize

NAACP Image Awards
The NAACP Image Awards are presented annually by the American National Association for the Advancement of Colored People to honor outstanding people of color in film, television, music, and literature.

NAMIC Vision Awards

People's Choice Awards
The People's Choice Awards have been held annually since 1975. Hosted by Procter & Gamble they claim to honor shows based on the opinions of the general public.

Screen Actors Guild Awards 
The Screen Actors Guild Awards are presented by the Screen Actors Guild.

Satellite Awards
The Satellite Awards, formerly known as the Golden Satellite Awards, are presented annually by the International Press Academy, for both for cinema and television.

Teen Choice Awards
The Teen Choice Awards are presented annually by the Fox Broadcasting Company and Global Television Network. The program honors the year's biggest achievements in music, movies, sports, and television, as voted by teenagers aged twelve to nineteen.

Television Critics Association Award
The Television Critics Association (or TCA) is a group of approximately 200 United States and Canadian journalists and columnists who cover television programming. Since 1984 the organization has hosted the TCA Awards, honoring television excellence in 11 categories, which are presented every summer.

Texas Film Hall of Fame
The Texas Film Hall of Fame have been held annually since 2001. Hosted by Austin Film Society, it honors outstanding Texans who've made a significant contribution to filmmaking and entertainment, as well as non-Texans who've made significant strides in the advancement of the Texas entertainment industry and also classic Texas films and television programs.

Writers Guild of America
The Writers Guild of America Awards are presented annually by the Writers Guild of America.

Young Hollywood Awards

References

External links
 Awards for Friday Night Lights at IMDb

Friday Night Lights (TV series)
Friday Night Lights